Fidler's Mill is a historic grist mill located at Arlington, Upshur County, West Virginia. It was built in 1847-1849 and enlarged in 1916.  It is a two to four story frame building built of yellow poplar on a stone foundation.  The mill provided ground wheat and buckwheat for flour, and ground cornmeal, and also housed wool carding machines, which were used seasonally.

Both mill and town were named for Alfious Arlington Fidler, proprietor. It was listed on the National Register of Historic Places in 1997.

References

External links

Grinding mills on the National Register of Historic Places in West Virginia
Industrial buildings completed in 1849
Buildings and structures in Upshur County, West Virginia
National Register of Historic Places in Upshur County, West Virginia
Grinding mills in West Virginia
1849 establishments in Virginia